Fade Up is a song released in June 2022 by Belgian rappers Hamza and Damso

Charts

Certifications

References

2019 singles
2019 songs
French-language songs